Luzifer is a 2021 Austrian supernatural horror drama film written and directed by Peter Brunner. Starring Susanne Jensen and Franz Rogowski, the film centers on a man who lives in a secluded alpine hut with his mother and his pet eagle, their relative peace and faith shattered as strange and increasingly sinister supernatural occurrences begin to unfold around them.

The film had its world premiere in August 2021 at the Locarno Filmfestival, before premiering in the United States at Fantastic Fest the following month. There Franz Rogowski received the award for the best actor for his role as "Johannes". In October 2021, Rogowski was awarded Best Actor for this role ex-aequo with Caleb Landrey Jones (Nitram)  at the Sitges Filmfestival. Also Susanne Jensen was awarded Best Actress for her role as "Maria" ex-aequo with Noomi Rapace (Lamb) at the Sitges Filmfestival.

Plot 
Maria (Susanne Jensen) lives secluded in the mountains with her mentally handicapped adult son Johannes (Franz Rogowski). Her husband died. Their everyday life is determined by religious rituals and familiarity. Johannes' best friend is the eagle Arthur. When the area is to be converted into a ski resort, the devil awakens. Maria tries to protect her son. Faith, trust, powerlessness and childishness become an explosive mixture. Is an exorcism the solution? Where is the devil?

Cast
 Susanne Jensen as Maria
 Franz Rogowski as Johannes

Reception 

Critical response for Luzifer has been mostly positive, with many critics praising the film for its performances, atmosphere, and mature themes.
Noel Murray of Los Angeles Times praised Rogowski's performance and cinematograph, calling it "an unflinching, Werner Herzog-style portrait of people living on society’s fringes".

Awards 
 2021: Boccalino d'Oro for director Peter Brunner in Locarno Filmfestival
 2021: Best Actor for Franz Rogowski (Luzifer and Freaks Out) Fantastic Fest, Austin
 2021: Best Actress for Susanne Jensen ex-aequo with Noomi Rapace (Lamb) at Sitges Film Festival
 2021: Best Actor for Franz Rogowski ex-aequo with Caleb Landrey Jones (Nitram) at Sitges Film Festival
 2022: Best Feature Film at Pendance Film Festival, Toronto, Canada

References

External links 
 
 

2021 films
2021 drama films
2021 horror films
2020s horror drama films
2020s supernatural horror films
Austrian drama films
Austrian horror films
Demons in film
German horror drama films
2020s German-language films
German supernatural horror films
Religious horror films
Supernatural drama films